Methioeme brevipennis is a species of beetle in the family Cerambycidae, the only species in the genus Methioeme.

References

Xystrocerini
Monotypic beetle genera